Appleton railway station served a primarily industrial area of Widnes, England. It was located on the southern section of the former St Helens and Runcorn Gap Railway.

History

The station was opened by the St Helens and Runcorn Gap Railway which was later absorbed by the London and North Western Railway. The L&NWR in turn became part of the London Midland and Scottish Railway at the Grouping of 1923. The station then passed to the London Midland Region of British Railways on nationalisation in 1948, only to be closed by the British Transport Commission three years later. The line continued in freight use until 1981.

The site today

The site is buried under the A557 road. The nearest notable landmark to the station site is the Commercial Inn public house.

Services
In 1922 ten trains called at the station in each direction, Monday to Saturday, plying between St Helens Shaw St and Ditton Junction via Widnes South. Some trains continued to Runcorn and some to Liverpool Lime Street. All trains were 3rd Class only. No trains called on Sundays.

In 1951 the service was sparser but more complex. Six trains called in each direction, Monday to Friday, the early morning ones providing both 1st and 3rd Class accommodation. On Saturdays four trains called in each direction, 3rd Class only. No trains called on Sundays.

References

Notes

Sources

External links
 The station on an 1888-1913 Overlay OS Map via National Library of Scotland
 The station on an old OS map via npe maps
 The station via Disused Stations UK
 an illustrated history of the line via 8D Association

Disused railway stations in the Borough of Halton
Former London and North Western Railway stations
Railway stations in Great Britain opened in 1833
Railway stations in Great Britain closed in 1951